Brigadier John Mugyenyi is a military officer in Uganda. He is a senior commander in the Uganda People's Defence Force (UPDF). As of August 2014, he was undeployed. Mugyenyi is reported to be heavily invested in construction, real estate, luxury hotels, apartment houses, and financial institutions. According to a 2014 published report, he was one of the wealthiest individuals in Uganda.

Military service
He previously served as the director of the Joint Anti-Terrorist Taskforce, a rapid response, counter-terrorism unit within the UPDF. Before that, he served in 2001 as a military intelligence officer and was instrumental in defeating rebels belonging to the People's Redemption Army. He has also served as the commanding officer of Entebbe Airport Aviation Security, where his unit was active against drug smugglers. In the 1990s, he was one of the commanders in the Ituri conflict in the Democratic Republic of the Congo. In January 2005, he retired from the army at the rank of lieutenant colonel, and he has been mainly focused on his businesses, in construction and finance. In January 2013, he was promoted to the rank of brigadier.

Personal
Mugyenyi is a married father.

See also
List of wealthiest people in Uganda

References

External links
 Colonel Mugyenyi Promoted To Brigadier

Ankole people
Living people
Ugandan military personnel
Year of birth missing (living people)
Ituri conflict